Enrédate y verás ("Get Involved and See") is a 1948 Mexican film directed by Carlos Orellana. It was written by Luis Alcoriza.

External links
 

1948 films
1940s Spanish-language films
Mexican black-and-white films
Mexican romantic comedy films
1948 romantic comedy films
1940s Mexican films